Rhachiocephalus is an extinct genus of dicynodont therapsid.

References
 The main groups of non-mammalian synapsids at Mikko's Phylogeny Archive

Dicynodonts
Lopingian synapsids of Africa
Fossil taxa described in 1898
Taxa named by Harry Seeley
Lopingian genus first appearances
Lopingian genus extinctions
Anomodont genera